Cooper Lake or Lake Cooper may refer to:

Places

United States
 Cooper Lake (New York)
 Cooper Lake, Colorado, adjoins Sloan Lake
 Cooper Lake (Texas)
 Cooper Lake State Park, Texas
 Cooper Lake (Washington), in the Alpine Lakes Wilderness

Australia
 Lake Cooper (Victoria), near Corop, Victoria

Other uses
 Cooper Lake (microprocessor), the codename for a processor family developed by Intel as a successor to Cascade Lake